The Rural Municipality of Moose Creek No. 33 is a rural municipality (RM) in the Canadian province of Saskatchewan within Census Division No. 1 and  Division No. 1.

History
The RM of Moose Creek No. 33 incorporated as a rural municipality on 12 December, 1910.

Moose Creek United Church and Cemetery
Moose Creek United Church and Cemetery, also known as Moose Creek Methodist Church until 1925 when it joined the United Church, is an historical site located within the RM.

The initial funding to build the church came from community donations and a $1,500 loan at 8% interest from John Hewitt. When he died in 1927, the balance of the loan was cancelled. The cemetery was established two years after the completion of the church, in 1918. The cemetery is the final resting place for many of the early settlers. The first wedding there was between Tom Cook and Isabel Wallace and was officiated by Reverend F.B. Ball

On 5 March, 1991, the church and cemetery were designated a Municipal Heritage Resource and on 10 August, they were added to the Register for Canada's Historic Places.

Gallery

Geography

Communities and localities
The following urban municipalities are surrounded by the RM.

Towns
 Alameda

The following unincorporated communities are within the RM.

Localities
 Auburnton
 Douglaston

Demographics

Government
The RM of Moose Creek No. 33 is governed by an elected municipal council and an appointed administrator that meets on the second Wednesday of every month. The reeve of the RM is Howard Sloan while its administrator is Sentura Freitag. The RM's office is located in Alameda.

See also
List of historic places in rural municipalities of Saskatchewan
List of historic places in Saskatchewan
Lists of historic places in Canada

References

External links 

M
Division No. 1, Saskatchewan